Berks, Bucks and Oxon Division 1 is an English rugby union league featuring teams from Berkshire, Buckinghamshire and Oxfordshire. As with all of the divisions in this area at this level, the entire league is made up of second and third teams of clubs whose first teams play at a higher level of the rugby union pyramid. As this is the top league in the region for second teams there is no promotion to a higher league. Relegated teams drop to Berks/Bucks & Oxon 2.

The division was created in 2004-05 as part of a complete overhaul of the Berks/Bucks & Oxon league, with a large number of 2nd, 3rd and 4th teams entering at various levels, and was divided into north and south regions,  with the original Berks/Bucks & Oxon 1 division becoming the Berks/Bucks & Oxon Premier and Berks/Bucks & Oxon 1 becoming, in effect, division 2 of the system. Rather confusingly promoted 1st teams would go up into the Berks/Bucks & Oxon Premier while 2nd, 3rd and 4th teams would move into Berks/Bucks & Oxon Premier A. The league would be restructured once more in 2011-12 with the re-introduction of a new tier 2 competition - the Berks/Bucks & Oxon Championship and the cancellation of Berks/Bucks & Oxon Premier A. This meant that Berks/Bucks & Oxon 1 (now merged into one league instead of two regional ones) would be for 2nd teams and below only with no chance of promotion to a higher league (although relegation was still possible).

Participating Clubs 2016-17
Amersham & Chiltern II
Aylesbury II
Bracknell II
Chinnor III
Maidenhead IV
Reading II
Reading Abbey II
Redingensians III
Thatcham II
Windsor II
Witney II

Participating Clubs 2012–13

Beaconsfield II
Bracknell III
Chinnor III
Henley III
High Wycombe II
Maidenhead II
Marlow II
Reading II
Redingensians III
Windsor II
Witney II

Berks/Bucks & Oxon 1 North Honours

Berks/Bucks & Oxon 1 South Honours

Berks/Bucks & Oxon 1 Honours

See also
 Berkshire RFU
 Buckinghamshire RFU
 Oxfordshire RFU
 English rugby union system
 Rugby union in England

References

Rugby union leagues in the English Midlands
Rugby union in Buckinghamshire
Rugby union in Oxfordshire
Rugby union in Berkshire